Rocks in the Head is Roger Daltrey's eighth solo album. The album was released in 1992 on Atlantic Records, and recorded at The Hit Factory.

Roger Daltrey's co-written songs

Roger Daltrey is credited (along with Gerard McMahon) for co-writing seven of the eleven tracks, including "Times Changed", "You Can't Call It Love", "Love Is", "Blues Man's Road", "Days of Light", "Everything a Heart Could Ever Want", and "Unforgettable Opera".

The notes credit "Musical Direction and Production" to Gerard McMahon, who also performs as a primary backup musician.

Cover photography and design were by Graham Hughes.

Song overview

"Everything a Heart Could Ever Want (Willow)" was written about Daltrey's daughter. Daltrey’s son, Jamie, sings backing vocals on the song.

"Days of Light" peaked at No. 6 on the U.S. rock charts.

Track listing

Personnel
Roger Daltrey - guitar, harmonica, vocals
Emily Burridge - cello  
Ricky Byrd - guitar, backing vocals 
Jamie Daltrey - backing vocals     
Mark Egan - bass  
Gregg Gerson - drums
Don Henze - backing vocals
Pim Jones - guitar, acoustic guitar, slide guitar, soloist, wah wah guitar  
David Katz - bass, keyboards, violin  
Robert Lamm - piano  
Jay Leonhart - upright bass 
Jody Linscott - percussion    
Gerard McMahon - guitar, keyboards, musical director, backing vocals  
Billy Nicholls - backing vocals  
Thommy Price - drums   
Dave Ruffy - drums  
Jenny Ruffy - backing vocals  
Shaun Solomon - bass  
Pat Sommers - backing vocals  
John Van Eps - keyboards, programming, Synclavier  
Vinnie Zumm - flamenco guitar, soloist

References

External links
 Album review/credit listing
 

1992 albums
Roger Daltrey albums
Atlantic Records albums